Anthony Kirwan (born 1974) is an Irish hurler who presently plays with Mount Sion GAA at club level and formerly with Waterford GAA at inter-county level.

Honours
 Munster Minor Hurling Championship winner - 1992
 Waterford Senior Hurling Championship winner - 1994, 1998, 2000, 2002, 2003, 2004 and 2006.
 Waterford Minor Hurling Championship winner - 1991

Championship Appearances

Waterford inter-county hurlers
Mount Sion hurlers
People from Waterford (city)
Living people
1974 births